Picea smithiana is a species of evergreen tree in the family Pinaceae family It is referred to by the common names morinda spruce and West Himalayan spruce, and is a spruce native to the western Himalaya and adjacent mountains, from northeast Afghanistan, northern Pakistan, India to central Nepal. It grows at altitudes of 2,400-3,600 m in forests together with deodar cedar, blue pine and pindrow fir.

Description

Picea smithiana is a large evergreen tree growing to 40–55 m tall (exceptionally to 60 m), and with a trunk diameter of up to 1–2 m. It has a conical crown with level branches and usually pendulous branchlets.

The shoots are pale buff-brown, and glabrous (hairless). The leaves are needle-like, the longest of any spruce, 3–5 cm long, rhombic in cross-section, mid-green with inconspicuous stomatal lines. The cones are broad cylindric-conic, 9–16 cm long and 3 cm broad, green when young, maturing buff-brown and opening to 5–6 cm broad 5–7 months after pollination; the scales are stiff and smoothly rounded.

Morinda spruce is a popular ornamental tree in large gardens in western Europe for its attractive pendulous branchlets. It is also grown to a small extent in forestry for timber and paper production, though its slower growth compared to Norway spruce reduces its importance outside of its native range. The name morinda derives from the tree's name in Nepali.

Etymology
Picea means 'pitch', and is derived from the ancient Latin word of the same meaning, pix. The name is in reference to the sticky sap produced by members of this genus.

Smithiana is named for James Edward Smith, an English botanist and the founder of the Linnaean Society.

References

External links
Gymnosperm Database

smithiana
Trees of Afghanistan
Flora of West Himalaya
Trees of Nepal
Trees of Pakistan
Least concern plants
Taxa named by Pierre Edmond Boissier
Taxa named by Nathaniel Wallich